Sikhoraphum railway station is a railway station located in Ra-ngaeng Subdistrict, Sikhoraphum District, Surin Province.

References 

Railway stations in Thailand
Surin province